Akada Shin Tameike Dam is an earthfill dam located in Shimane Prefecture in Japan. The dam is used for irrigation. The catchment area of the dam is 13 km2. The dam impounds about 2  ha of land when full and can store 138 thousand cubic meters of water. The construction of the dam was completed in 1987.

References

Dams in Shimane Prefecture
1987 establishments in Japan